Yrius Roberto Carboni (born 22 July 1986 in Salvador) is a Brazilian football player who is currently unattached. He played in the Netherlands for FC Eindhoven and Helmond Sport.

References

1986 births
Living people
Brazilian footballers
Brazilian expatriate footballers
Eerste Divisie players
PEC Zwolle players
FC Eindhoven players
Expatriate footballers in the Netherlands
Brazilian expatriate sportspeople in the Netherlands
Association football forwards
Sportspeople from Salvador, Bahia